Mág may refer to:

 Mag (Hungarian: Mág), a village near the town of Săliște, Romania
 Magyar Általános Gépgyár Rt, Hungarian General Machine Factory
 Mág (film), a 1988 Czech film